Abbas Quli is a Turkic-derived Muslim male given name built from quli.

People
 Abbasqoli Mo'tamad-dawla Javanshir
 Abbas Qoli Khan Qajar
 Abbasgulu Bakikhanov
 Abbasgulu bey Shadlinski